The 2019 season was the 69th season of competitive association football in China.

Promotion and relegation

National teams

China national football team

China women's national football team

AFC competitions

2019 AFC Champions League

Qualifying play-offs

Play-off round

Group stage

Group E

Group F

Group G

Group H

Men's football

League season

Chinese Super League

China League One

China League Two

North Group

South Group

Overall table

Chinese FA Super Cup

References

 
Seasons in Chinese football